The phrase Australia First can refer to:

 Australia First Movement (founded 1941)
 Australia First Party (founded 1996)